The city of Vancouver, Canada, held municipal elections on November 16, 1996. Canadian citizens who were over 18 years of age at the time of the vote, and had been a resident of Vancouver for the previous 30 days and a resident of B.C. for the previous six months, were able to vote for candidates in four races that were presented on one ballot. In addition, Canadian citizen non-resident property owners were eligible to vote.

The ballot elected one mayor, ten councillors, nine School Board trustees and seven Park Board commissioners. Each elector could vote for as many candidates as there were open seats (e.g., an elector could vote for ten or fewer councillors).

There was no fee associated with registering as a candidate at this time. Brian "Godzilla" Salmi, a freelance journalist for publications such as Terminal City, The Stranger, The National Post and The Georgia Straight, publicly offered to buy a pitcher of beer for anyone who ran for office, resulting in numerous joke-candidates appearing on the ballots that year.

Elections to Vancouver City Council

Overall council results
All figures include votes cast for both mayor and councillors

Mayoralty election
One to be elected.

Councillors election
Ten to be elected.

Elections to the Vancouver Parks Board
Seven to be elected.

External links
 City of Vancouver election results 1996
 Vancouver charter 
 Vancouver School Board (School District #39) 
 Vancouver Board of Parks and Recreation

1996 elections in Canada
Municipal elections in Vancouver